Matua festiva is a species of ground spider endemic to New Zealand.

References 

Gnaphosidae
Spiders described in 1979